Virgil Charles Aldrich (13 September 1903 in Narsinghpur, India – 28 May 1998 in Salt Lake City, Utah), was an American philosopher of art, language, and religion.

Early life and education
The son of Floyd Clement Aldrich and his wife Ann Hanley, Virgil Aldrich earned his Bachelor of Arts degree at Ohio Wesleyan University in 1925. He studied at Oxford University in 1927 and then went on to earn a Diplôme d'Études Supérieures de Philosophie at the Sorbonne in 1928 before completing his Ph.D. at the University of California Berkeley in 1931. He married Louise Hafliger on 3 September 1927 and they had one son, David Virgil Aldrich.

Academic career
Aldrich's first academic appointment was his appointment as an instructor in philosophy at Rice University in 1931 and Sterling Fellow at Yale University in 1931-32. Promoted to assistant professor, he remained at Rice until 1942, when he was appointed visiting professor at Columbia University from 1942 to 1946. Appointed professor of philosophy at Kenyon College in 1946, he remained there until 1965, serving as visiting professor at Brown University in 1962-63. In 1965, he became professor of philosophy at the University of North Carolina at Chapel Hill, where he remained until his retirement in 1972.  On his retirement, he moved to Salt Lake City, Utah, where he became an adjunct professor at the University of Utah.

Aldrich served as Director of the Kyoto American Studies Institute in Japan and for short periods was visiting professor at Harvard University, the University of Michigan, and the University of Texas.  He served as trustee and president of the American Society of Aesthetics and president of American Philosophical Association.

"Some Meanings of Vague" (1937)

In his article "Some Meanings of Vague", Aldrich puts forth a series of definitions of vague objects and sensum, and then argues that any empiricist must account for vague sensum every bit as much as clear sensum, without skirting the issue.  He takes there to be many kinds of vagueness—importantly, there is vagueness of symbols and vagueness of senses.  Here symbols are anything which is used to refer, including verbal words, signs, pictures, and more.  Vagueness regarding symbols can be the same as the vagueness which regards the senses.  There can, additionally, be vagueness of the practices surrounding the use of the symbol to refer.  These, he suggests, should be avoided.

Honors
 L.H.D., Ohio Wesleyan University, 1963
 L.H.D., Kenyon College, 1972

Writings
Books:
 Language and philosophy ([Kyoto]: Kyoto American Studies Seminar, 1955)
 Philosophy of Art, (Englewood Cliffs, N.J., Prentice-Hall, 1963)
 The Body of a Person, (Lanham, MD: University Press of America, 1988)
 My Century, Nantucket, Massachusetts, EditAndPublishYourBook.com/Lulu, 20 November 2010
 Philosophical Reflections, Nantucket, Massachusetts, EditAndPublishYourBook.com/Lulu, 
11 December 2010

Contributions:
 Readings in Philosophical Analysis (1951)
 Reflections on Art (1958)
 Religious Experience and Truth (1961)
 Faith and the Philosophers (1962)
 World Perspectives on Philosophy (1967)
 "Design, Composition, and Symbol", The Journal of Aesthetics and Art Criticism (Vol. 27, No. 4, Summer, 1969), pp. 379–388.
 Studies in philosophy: a symposium on Gilbert Ryle, Edited by Konstantin Kolenda. (Houston, Tex. : William Marsh Rice University, 1972)
 "Pictures and Persons" in Review of Metaphysics (1975)
 "Description and expression: Physicalism restricted," Inquiry vol. 20 (1977), pp. 149–164.
 Falling in love with wisdom: American philosophers talk about their calling, edited by David D. Karnos, Robert G. Shoemaker. (New York : Oxford University Press, 1993

Festschrift
 Body, mind, and method: essays in honor of Virgil C. Aldrich edited by Donald F. Gustafson and Bangs L. Tapscott. (Dordrecht and Boston: D. Reidel Pub. Co., 1979)

See also
American philosophy
List of American philosophers

References

Sources
 University of Utah Library
 Marquis Who's Who

External links
Kenyon College Obituary
  Inventory of the Vigil Aldrich Papers, Marriott Library, University of Utah
Body, Mind and Method available at Google Books
Entry for Virgil Aldrich at JSTOR
Review at the Journal of Symbolic Logic

1903 births
1998 deaths
20th-century American philosophers
Alumni of the University of Oxford
Indian emigrants to the United States
Philosophers from Texas
Philosophers from New York (state)
Philosophers of language
Ohio Wesleyan University alumni
University of Paris alumni
University of California, Berkeley alumni
Philosophers from Utah
Philosophers from North Carolina
Rice University faculty
Columbia University faculty
University of Utah faculty
Kenyon College faculty
University of North Carolina at Chapel Hill faculty
Philosophers of art
People from Narsinghpur
University of Michigan faculty
American male writers of Indian descent
American expatriates in France
Philosophers from Ohio
American male non-fiction writers
20th-century American male writers
American expatriates in England